Alexandre Sabatou (born 8 February 1993) is a French politician of the National Rally who was elected as a Member of the National Assembly for Oise's 3rd constituency in 2022.

Biography
Sabatou was born in February 1993. He trained as an engineer and worked as an industrial and mining engineer before becoming an information systems manager for the Direction centrale de la police aux frontières border force in 2021.

He began his political career as the head of the youth wing for Debout la France in 2018. However, he left Debout la France in 2020 and became a member of the Avenir Français (French Future) movement founded by former DLF politicians Alexandre Loubet and Thomas Ménagé.

In 2020 he joined the National Rally and stood for the party in Méru during the 2021 French regional elections. For the 2022 French legislative election Sabatou contested the seat of Oise's 3rd constituency and won the seat during the second round.

References

1993 births
Living people
National Rally (France) politicians
21st-century French politicians
Deputies of the 16th National Assembly of the French Fifth Republic
French engineers
Debout la France politicians